Sabattus is a census-designated place (CDP) comprising the primary village in the town of Sabattus, Androscoggin County, Maine, United States. It is situated in the northwest corner of the town, at the outlet of Sabattus Pond and the start of the Sabattus River, a south-flowing tributary of the Androscoggin River. Maine State Route 126 forms the southern edge of the CDP; the highway leads west  to the center of Lewiston and northeast  to Gardiner. State Route 9 runs south from Sabattus  to Lisbon Falls and follows Route 126 northeast to Gardiner.

Sabattus was first listed as a CDP prior to the 2020 census.

Demographics

References 

Census-designated places in Androscoggin County, Maine
Census-designated places in Maine